Ivo Žerava (born 31 December 1971) is a Czech rower. He competed in the men's coxed four event at the 1992 Summer Olympics.

References

1971 births
Living people
Czech male rowers
Olympic rowers of Czechoslovakia
Rowers at the 1992 Summer Olympics
Sportspeople from Brno